The Swindler is a 1919 British silent drama film directed by Maurice Elvey and starring Cecil Humphreys, Marjorie Hume and Neville Percy. It was based on a short story by Ethel M. Dell.

Cast
 Cecil Humphreys - Nat Verney
 Marjorie Hume - Cynthia Mortimer
 Neville Percy - Archie Mortimer
 Teddy Arundell - Inspector West
 Allan Hunter - Lord Babbacombe

References

External links

1919 films
1919 drama films
British drama films
British silent feature films
1910s English-language films
Films directed by Maurice Elvey
Films based on works by Ethel M. Dell
Films based on short fiction
British black-and-white films
1910s British films
Silent drama films